Daggubati is an Indian surname that may refer to

 Daggubati Purandeswari, Indian politician, wife of Daggubati Venkateshwara Rao
 Daggubati Venkateswara Rao, member of the Indian National Congress
 D. Ramanaidu (Daggubati Ramanaidu, 1936–2015), Indian film producer
 Daggubati Suresh Babu, Telugu film producer and managing director of Suresh Productions
 Daggubati Venkatesh, Indian film actor
 Rana Daggubati, Indian film actor, producer, visual effects coordinator and photographer

See also
Daggubati-Akkineni family

Surnames of Indian origin